The Roman (original title Ihmiskunnan viholliset, which translates to Mankind's Enemies) is a fiction novel by Mika Waltari published in 1964, and was the last work of Waltari to be published during his lifetime. Set in Rome, the book is a sequel to The Secret of the Kingdom, a novel about the early days of Christianity. The protagonist and narrator is Minutus, the son of Marcus, the main character of the previous novel. Minutus is a Roman citizen striving to survive without political entanglements.

In the novel, Minutus travels from Corinth to Britain, to Rome and then to Jerusalem. Through a boyhood friendship with Nero, he becomes a sometimes advisor, sometimes a tool, and sometimes a fool of the capricious emperor. A cruel fate makes him the commander of the menagerie that supplied the wild animals that tore his firstborn son to pieces, and the book was ostensibly written as a guide for his second son, great-grandson of the Emperor Claudius.

Plagiarism of the novel
In July 2008, news emerged that the novel had been plagiarized by television producer Colin Slater (Rapsittie Street Kids: Believe In Santa) in his novel Lindum Colonia, published in 2003.

References

Novels by Mika Waltari
Historical novels
Novels set in ancient Rome
Books about Nero
1964 novels
Hodder & Stoughton books
20th-century Finnish novels